Roberta Piket (born 1965) is an American jazz pianist, organist, composer, and arranger.

Life and career
Piket was born in Queens, New York, in 1965. Her father was composer Frederick Piket. She started playing the piano at the age of 7 and moved to jazz in her early teens. A university joint double-degree program led to her receiving a computer science degree from Tufts University and a jazz studies degree from the New England Conservatory of Music. While at university, she took private lessons from Stanley Cowell, Fred Hersch, Jim McNeely, and Bob Moses.

Her first album as leader was Unbroken Line, recorded for Criss Cross in 1996. Her first album for a U.S. label was in 1999: Live at the Blue Note, for Half Note. The 2003 release I'm Back in Therapy and It's All Your Fault was Piket's first with her Alternating Current ensemble. This band was formed after she acquired an electric piano to use in venues that did not have an acoustic piano and then discovered that it did not suit her trio but made her think of new types of music to play.

On Billy Mintz's 2014 album Mintz Quartet, Piket played piano, organ, and sang on one track. She had done the same thing for her earlier album, Sides, Colors, which also included several tracks she arranged for wind instruments, horn instruments, and strings. She was named Rising Star – Organ by DownBeat critics in 2018.

Playing style
The DownBeat reviewer of Emanation (Solo: Volume 2) commented on the absence of a "steady pulse, stride or walking bass" in her solo piano playing; "Instead, she establishes momentum through a rhythmic motif [...and] keeps things moving through more intricate alterations between her hands".

Discography
An asterisk (*) indicates that the year is that of release.

As leader/co-leader

As sidewoman

References

1965 births
American jazz pianists
Living people
20th-century American pianists
20th-century American women pianists
21st-century American pianists
21st-century American women pianists
Criss Cross Jazz artists
Fresh Sounds Records artists